Vimpeli is a municipality of Finland. The most significant road connection in the municipality is the main road 68 between towns of Virrat and Jakobstad.

Vimpeli was crucial in the Winter War due to its ski-factory that created over half of the skis used in the war.

In sport, Vimpeli is known for the success of its Finnish baseball team, Vimpelin Veto, which won gold in the 2010, 2016 and 2017 seasons in the Finnish championships. The Saarikenttä ballpark is the home field of Vimpelin Veto, and its well-known competitor is Sotkamon Jymy from Sotkamo, known as long-time arch-enemy of Vimpelin Veto.

The municipality is unilingually Finnish.

Geography
Vimpeli's neighboring municipalities are Alajärvi, Lappajärvi, Perho and Veteli.

Villages 

 Hallapuro
 Huopana
 Kirkonkylä
 Koskela
 Lakaniemi
 Pokela
 Pyhälahti
 Rantakylä
 Sääksjärvi
 Viitaniemi
 Vinni

Notable people born in Vimpeli
Matti Latvala (1868 – 1964)
Santeri Mäkelä (1870 – 1938)
Juho Haveri (1876 – 1961)
Antti Rentola (1881 – 1919)
Väinö Rankila (1911 – 1970)
Terttu Savola (1941 – )
Jukka Vihriälä (1945 – )

Gallery

References

External links

Municipality of Vimpeli – Official website

Municipalities of South Ostrobothnia
Populated places established in 1866
1866 establishments in the Russian Empire